The Capitol Region Athletic League (CRAL) is a high school athletic conference in Connecticut affiliated with the CIAC. Founded in 2013, its members are mainly located in Greater Hartford and consists of former members of the defunct Constitution State Conference.

Membership

References

External links
 

Education in Connecticut
High school sports conferences and leagues in the United States
Education in Hartford County, Connecticut
Sports in Connecticut